Jomde Kena (Taramori, Gensi, 31 December 1967 – Guwahati, Assam, 4 September 2017) was a politician of Bharatiya Janata Party from Arunachal Pradesh.

In 2014, he won Likabali seat from Lower Siang district in Arunachal Pradesh Legislative Assembly on Indian National Congress ticket but later switched sides with  People's Party of Arunachal then with Bharatiya Janata Party.

He was also Deputy Speaker of Arunachal Pradesh Legislative Assembly from 2009 to 2014 and held the post of Transport Minister from 2014 to 2016.

He was Health and Family Welfare Minister in Pema Khandu ministry.

On 4 September 2017 Kena died in a private hospital at Guwahati after prolonged illness. He is survived by his wife, four daughters and two sons.

References

External links
My neta profile
JanPratinidhi Profile

1965 births
2017 deaths
People from Lower Siang district
Arunachal Pradesh MLAs 2009–2014
Arunachal Pradesh MLAs 2014–2019
Bharatiya Janata Party politicians from Arunachal Pradesh
People's Party of Arunachal politicians
Indian National Congress politicians
State cabinet ministers of Arunachal Pradesh
Deputy Speakers of the Arunachal Pradesh Legislative Assembly